Daltyn Knutson (born March 1, 1997) is an American soccer player who plays as a midfielder for Union Omaha in USL League One.

Career

Professional
In March 2019, Knutson signed for USL League One club Tormenta FC. He made his league debut for the club on April 3, 2019, coming on as an 89th minute substitute for Conner Antley in a 3-1 home win over FC Tucson.

Knutson joined League One expansion side Union Omaha on January 14, 2020.

References

External links
 
 Profile at Central Arkansas University Athletics

1997 births
Living people
American soccer players
Association football midfielders
Central Arkansas Bears soccer players
Derby City Rovers players
GPS Portland Phoenix players
People from Spring, Texas
Soccer players from Texas
Sportspeople from Harris County, Texas
Tormenta FC players
USL League One players
USL League Two players
Union Omaha players